Charles William (C. W.) Burpo (January 4, 1904 - March 1982)  was a nationally known radio evangelist who was heard in the USA during the 1970s. His program was known as the "Bible Institute of the Air", the same name as his ministry. Dr. Burpo broadcast from his studio at The Bible Institute of the Air, Inc., of which he was the Director; it was located in Mesa, Arizona.  He was on WXRI-FM, the flagship RADIO station of the Christian Broadcasting Network (CBN) back in the mid-70s.  His program aired Monday - Friday @ 6:30 p.m.

Views
"Doctor Burpo", as he was known, was a supporter of what is today classed as conservative, anti-communist  politics mixed with fundamental religion. His broadcasting signature was the sound effect of a closing door announcing his intention to pray in his radio "Throne Room". His fame appears to have died with him.

References

Further reading
Burpo, C. W. Throne Room Rights. 1971. (76 pages) The Bible Institute of the Air, Mesa, Arizona. See: book review by Rev. R. L. Choleva. (Dr. Burpo) "...was best remembered during the mid 1970s as a Minister of the Gospel who had the radio program known as the Radio Chapel of the Air who would come on the air every day Monday through Friday ...at about 1:00 pm in the afternoon. His lasting impression was how he could pray and the effect he left on me because he was very original and plain and also simple."
Burpo, C. W. An Angry American, no publication date, (160 pages), The Bible Institute of the Air, Mesa, Arizona

 A chapter on Burpo

External links 
Northwestern State University Libraries: Kent Courtney Collection (Reel to Reel Tape Collection) - The Bible Institute of the Air, Inc., Dr. C. W. Burpo, Director, P. O. Box 949, Mesa, Arizona.
University of Texas Press: Review of Border Radio - Dr. C. W. Burpo, director of The Bible Institute of the Air, told listeners, "Our heavenly Father loves you. Yes, he does, and I do too."
Reprint of Patriotic Article written by Dr. Burpo: George Washington's Vision at Valley Forge.

1904 births
1982 deaths
American anti-communists
American evangelists
Radio evangelists
New Right (United States)
20th-century American clergy